Pretty Broken is an American dramedy film that follows Lindsey Lou (Jillian Clare), as she tries to learn the steps after the death of her father. The films also stars Preston Bailey as Monty Lou (Lindsey's younger brother), Stacy Edwards as Caroline Lou (their mother), and Tyler Christopher as Jerry Carlyle.

Resonance Productions and Leonian Pictures are producing. Eichenberger is directing from Jill Remensnyder’s script about an unemployed college dropout on the verge of divorce who finds herself at her childhood home while her family grieves the death of her father.

The film was shot in its entirety in Portland, Oregon over a year span. It was previously titled "Free For All".

Pretty Broken started gaining attention when General Hospital star Tyler Christopher came on board as the male lead opposite Jillian Clare in the dark comedy.

The film held its world premiere at the 2018 Newport Beach Film Festival.

Cast 
 Jillian Clare as Lindsey Lou
 Tyler Christopher as Jerry Carlyle
 Stacy Edwards as Caroline
 Preston Bailey as Monty Lou
 Adam Chambers as Scott
 Peter Holden as Montgomery Lou
 Austin Hillebrecht as Liam Lou
 Cosondra Sjostrom as Sparrow
 Todd A. Robinson as Wallace
 Craig Michaelson as Chris

References

External links 
 IMDb
 Instagram
 Facebook
 Twitter
 Official Site

American comedy-drama films
Films shot in Portland, Oregon